The English rock group Pink Floyd played two tours in 1974. As well as performing the hit album The Dark Side of the Moon live, the band introduced new material that would eventually be recorded on the albums Wish You Were Here and Animals. Part of the tour was sponsored by the soft drink company Gini.

The tour was commercially successful, and featured improved lighting and a new video display system named "Mr Screen". However, the music was criticised in the press for being uninspiring and too similar to the studio albums.

1974 French Summer Tour

The 1974 French Summer Tour, was a short concert tour running from 18 to 26 June. The group wanted to upgrade their stage presentations and create a bigger visual impact, and the shows were a warm-up for the major British tour planned later in the year.

The first date of the tour was recorded by France's Europe 1 radio, with segments broadcast later in the year. It featured the debut of "Shine On You Crazy Diamond" (with the two halves played as one, as on the British 1974 tour) and "Raving and Drooling". The 22 June gig was the last time "Careful with that Axe, Eugene" was played aside from a one-off performance in 1977, while the last date on the tour, 26 June, was the last time "One of These Days" was played until 1987.

The French tour was the first time Pink Floyd used their iconic  circular display called "Mr. Screen". Ian Eames was recruited to create various animated sequences for parts of The Dark Side of the Moon. The screen caused logistical problems finding suitable venues, and consequently several shows were cancelled or moved dates. The tour was promoted by the soft drinks company Gini, which had been agreed to two years before. The contract required a serious of press promotional photographs, and a song for television advertising, written by Roger Waters and called "Bitter Love". The group were unhappy about the promotion, and donated their fee to charity.

On 25 June, the band were challenged to a football match by a group of journalists. They defeated the group 4-3.

Tour dates

Source : Povey 2007 p. 192

Set list
First set
"Shine On You Crazy Diamond"
"Raving and Drooling" (early version of "Sheep")
 "Echoes"

Second set
"Speak to Me" (extended tape)
"Breathe"
"On the Run"
"Time"
"The Great Gig in the Sky"
"Money"
"Us and Them"
"Any Colour You Like"
"Brain Damage"
"Eclipse"

Encore:
 "Careful With That Axe, Eugene" (18–22 June)
 "One of These Days" (24–26 June)

1974 British Winter Tour
Pink Floyd's British Winter Tour '74, was a short series of gigs that November and December. They featured the debut of "You Gotta Be Crazy". Pete Revell joined as screen projectionist for the tour; lighting engineer Arthur Max was retained from earlier tours but fired after a few shows. Gerald Scarfe collaborated with the band for the first time, designing the tour programme.

The 16 November show was recorded by BBC Radio One and the performance of Dark Side of the Moon was later broadcast on the Alan Freeman Show on 11 January 1975. This recording is included in the 2011 Dark Side of the Moon and Wish You Were Here box sets, except for "Echoes" which was released on 11 November 2016, as part of the 27-disc box set, The Early Years 1965–1972 which make up Live at the Empire Pool.

Although the tour was commercially successful, with every gig sold out, it was criticised in the press, and drew a backlash from reviewers, including journalist Nick Kent. He reviewed the 14 November gig for New Musical Express and disliked the new material, saying it was over-long and unimpressive, and criticised Gilmour's personal appearance.  A report in the Bristol Evening Post complained that the performance of The Dark Side of the Moon was identical to the studio version, "and that's something one doesn't go to concerts for".

Tour dates

Source : Povey 2007 pp. 193-194

Set list
First set
"Shine On You Crazy Diamond" (moved to third position on 17 November only)
"Raving and Drooling" (early version of "Sheep")
"You've Got to Be Crazy" (early version of "Dogs")
Second set
"Speak to Me" (extended tape)
"Breathe"
"On the Run"
"Time"
"The Great Gig in the Sky"
"Money"
"Us and Them"
"Any Colour You Like"
"Brain Damage"
"Eclipse"
Encore
"Echoes"

Personnel
David Gilmour – guitars, vocals, organ on "The Great Gig in the Sky"
Roger Waters – bass, vocals
Richard Wright – keyboards, vocals
Nick Mason – drums, percussion
Additional musicians:
Dick Parry – saxophone on "Money", "Us and Them", and "Echoes"
The Blackberries (Venetta Fields & Carlena Williams) – backing vocals

References 
Notes

References

Sources

 
 

Pink Floyd concert tours
1974 concert tours